Countersign may refer to one of the following :

 Countersign (military), a sign used by a sentry or guard.
 Countersign (legal), the writing of a second signature onto a document.